John McInally is the name of:

 John McInally (footballer, born 1915), Scottish footballer for Celtic
 John McInally (footballer, born 1951), Scottish footballer for Lincoln City and Colchester United